Can Tho University is a public research university in Can Tho, Vietnam. Established in 1966, it is a multidisciplinary university and a leading university in the Mekong Delta. Can Tho University is a leading agricultural research center in Vietnam. Can Tho University has nine colleges and three research institutes. Its goal is to be one of the leading higher education institutions in Vietnam and to be recognised as one of the top universities in the Asia-Pacific region in training and research by 2022.

Description

At present, the total number of CTU staff is around 2,000, including 1,203 lecturers (233 PhDs and 653 Masters, constituting to 73.6% of staff members with postgraduate degrees). The current training capacity of CTU is more than 45,000 students involving full-time undergraduate and postgraduate students, part-time as well as distance-learning ones. CTU possesses approximately 100 training programs and branches of undergraduate including 2 advanced training programs in English, 45 Master training programs (in which 1 program is a joint-ventured training field with foreign partners and 3 programs are taught in English) and 16 PhD ones, together with 2 training programs of junior college.

Up to now, Can Tho University (CTU) has 17 units for academic training (8 colleges, 7 schools, 1 high school, 1 unit for academic training) and several other support departments.

Colleges
This is a list of colleges the university has:

 College of Agriculture
 College of Aquaculture and Fisheries
 College of Economics
 College of Engineering
 College of Environment and Natural Resources
 College of ICT
 College of Rural Development
 College of Natural Sciences

Schools
 School of Education
 School of Foreign Languages
 School of Graduate
 School of Pre-University
 School of Political Science
 School of Social Sciences and Humanities
 School of Law

High school and academic training
 High school Teacher Practice
 Department of Physical Education

Centers and institutes

Centers
Cantho University Software Center (CUSC)
Academic Department
Software Department
Plan and Business Department
Center for Foreign Languages
Academic Department
Administration Department
Offices located in Campuses 1, 2, 3 and a contact staff in Campus 4 (Hoa An)
 Cooperative Training Center
 Center of National Defense Education

Institutes
 Biotechnology Research and Development Institute
 Mekong Delta Development Research Institute
 Research Institute for Climate Change

References 

 https://en.ctu.edu.vn/
 https://www.4icu.org/reviews/4885.htm

External links
Homepage of Cantho University

Universities in Vietnam
Cần Thơ
Buildings and structures in Cần Thơ
1966 establishments in Vietnam
Educational institutions established in 1966